Trifăuți is a village in Soroca District, Moldova.

Notable people
 Leonida Țurcan

References

Villages of Soroca District
Populated places on the Dniester